The Old Burying Ground (also known as St. Paul's Church Cemetery) is a historic cemetery in Halifax, Nova Scotia, Canada. It is located at the intersection of Barrington Street and Spring Garden Road in Downtown Halifax.

History 

The Old Burying Ground was founded in 1749, the same year as the settlement, as the town's first burial ground. It was originally non-denominational and for several decades was the only burial place for all Haligonians. (The burial ground was also used by St. Matthew's United Church). In 1793 it was turned over to the Anglican St. Paul's Church. The cemetery was closed in 1844 and the Camp Hill Cemetery established for subsequent burials. The site steadily declined until the 1980s when it was restored and refurbished by the Old Burying Ground Foundation, which now maintains the site and employ tour guides to interpret the site in the summer. Ongoing restoration of the rare 18th-century grave markers continues.

Over the decades some 12,000 people were interred in the Old Burial Ground. Today there are about 1,200 headstones, some having been lost and many others being buried with no headstone. Many notable residents are buried in the cemetery, including British Major General Robert Ross, who led the successful Washington Raid of 1814 and burned the White House before being killed in battle at Baltimore a few days later.

Commanders of three of the ships that served Governor Edward Cornwallis buried crew in unmarked graves: HMS Sphynx (1 crew), HMS Baltimore (1 crew) and HMS Albany (6 crew). HMS Sphynx was Cornwallis' own ship and the crew member was buried on the day his ship arrived in Halifax on 21 June 1749. HMS Albany was a 14-gun sloop commanded by Nova Scotia's senior naval officer, John Rous (1749–1753).

There are four recorded Mi'kmaq buried in the burial ground, including a Mi'kmaw Chief Francis [Muis]. There was also a "protestant indian" named John Tray, possibly from John Gorham's rangers.

There are also 167 recorded Blacks buried in the graveyard, all with unmarked graves. (There is a grave marker, however, of the Huntingdonian Missionary who taught at the first school for Black students in Halifax, Reverend William Furmage.) Blacks arrived with New England Planters. During the arrival of the Planters, there were 54 Blacks in Halifax. 7 Blacks were buried in the cemetery from 1763 to 1775.  Black Nova Scotians also arrived in Halifax with Boston Loyalists after the evacuation of Boston in 1776. During this period, 18 Blacks were buried in the cemetery (1776–1782).  Seventy-three free Black Nova Scotians (and no slaves) also arrived in Halifax with the New York Loyalists after evacuation from New York in 1783.  Of the 73 Blacks who arrived from New York, there were 4 burials that happened during this time period. Rev. John Breynton reported that in 1783 he baptized 40 Blacks and buried many because of disease.  Between the years 1792–1817 there are no recorded burials of Black Nova Scotians. The largest number of burials happen in the 1820s (72 graves), presumably the graves of the 155 Black Refugees who arrived in Halifax during the War of 1812.

The last erected and most prominent burial marker is the Welsford-Parker Monument, a Triumphal arch standing at the entrance to the cemetery commemorating British victory in the Crimean War. This is the first public monument built in Nova Scotia and is the fourth oldest war monument in Canada.  It is also the only monument to the Crimean War in North America. The arch was built in 1860, 16 years after the cemetery had officially closed. The arch was built by George Lang and is named after two Haligonians, Major Augustus Frederick Welsford and Captain William Buck Carthew Augustus Parker. Both Nova Scotians died in the Battle of the Great Redan during the Siege of Sevastopol (1854–1855). This monument was the last grave marker in the cemetery.

In 1938, the Grand Lodge of Massachusetts presented and dedicated a granite monument to Erasmus James Philipps, who is the earliest known settler of Nova Scotia (c. 1721) to be buried in the cemetery.  He was also the founder of Freemasonry in present-day Canada (1737).

The Old Burying Ground was designated a National Historic Site of Canada in 1991.  It had earlier been designated a Provincially Registered Property in 1988 under Nova Scotia's Heritage Property Act.

Prominent tombstones

Notable interments

Founding of Halifax (1749–1776) 

 Mary Morris, wife of Charles Morris (surveyor general)
 James Brenton
 Honourable William Nesbitt
 John Fillis (belonged to St. Matthew's)
 Priscilla Ball, died 10 May 1791, Black servant, unmarked grave
 Mi'kmaw Chief Francis [Muis/ Muice], died 16 February 1781, unmarked grave
 Captain William Kensey (Kenzie, Kinsey), sloop Vulture (1753–1755), died 30 April 1755, unmarked grave – he engaged in two naval battles to stop supplies going to the French, Mi'kmaw and Acadians; the battles were against La Margarite and another against the 'Nancy and Sally'

Siege of Louisbourg (1745) 
Many of those who first established Halifax arrived from Cape Breton, which the British of New England occupied since their Siege of Louisbourg (1745). The following participated in the Siege:

 Joseph Fairbanks, died 1790  (St. Matthew's)

American Revolution

Military figures 

 Peter Etter, died 1794, a loyalist who was friend of future President John Adams; son Peter Jr. fought with Joseph Gorham in the Royal Fencible American Regiment against the Eddy Rebellion; another son was Benjamin Etter
 John F. T. Gschwind (died 1827), surgeon for Hessians; arrived in Halifax 1781
 Charles Grant (military officer) (died 1785), 42nd Regiment of Foot – fought in the French and Indian War, Pontiac's War, and the American Revolution (New York and New Jersey campaign, the Philadelphia campaign, Battle of Stony Point, the Siege of Charleston, and the Siege of Yorktown), unmarked grave

Boston Loyalists 

The following were Loyalist refugees who settled in Halifax after they were banished from New York and Massachusetts. While most Loyalist came to the region from New York (over 66%), most of the Loyalists buried with grave markers are from Boston. Reflective of the fate of many of the Loyalists, the grave of Edward Winslow (scholar) is inscribed: "his fortune suffered shipwreck in the storm of civil war." Part of the devastation of the war resulted from American family members having to choose sides. For example, the story of one American patriot listed below, Benjamin Kent. While in Boston he imprisoned his son-in-law Sampson Salter Blowers for being a Loyalist. Blowers and the rest of Kent's family (including his wife) escaped to Halifax (1776). After the war, Kent eventually moved to Halifax to be with his family, which included Chief Justice Blowers (1885). Both Blowers and Kent are buried in the Old Burying Ground.

 Governor Paul Mascarene's grandchild William Handfield Snelling, died 1838
 Theophilus Lillie (died 26 May 1776), unmarked grave
 Byfield Lyde, (died 1776) unmarked grave
 John Lovell (loyalist) (died 17 July 1778), unmarked grave
 Christopher Minot (died 1783), unmarked grave
 George Brinley (died 1809), unmarked grave
 Jeremiah Dummer Rogers (died 1784), unmarked grave
 Archibald Cunningham (loyalist) (died 1820), unmarked grave
 Benning Wentworth (loyalist), died 1808 provincial secretary of Nova Scotia
 Capt. William Burton, 98th Regiment of Foot, died 1817 (Boston)
 Martha Howe, wife of John Howe, mother of Joseph Howe
 William Taylor, died 1810, a Boston merchant; father of James Taylor (Nova Scotia politician)
 Peter Lennox;
 Jonathan Sterns, died 1798, killed by Attorney General Richard John Uniacke
 Gilbert Stuart,
 Gregory Townsend
 William Burton (merchant) (c. 1748–1817)
 Sylvia (died 12 March 1824, age 70) black servant who resisted the American Privateers in the Raid on Lunenburg (1782)

Boston Patriot

New York Loyalists 

 Sarah Deblois, died 1827, Dr James Boggs' daughter-in-law
 Mary Young died 1784 (New York)
 Charles Geddes (merchant)
 Priscilla Ball, died 10 May 1791, Black servant, unmarked grave
 Daniel Bessonett

French Revolutionary Wars (1792–1802) 

During the French Revolutionary Wars, Prince Edward was stationed in Halifax and personally commemorated four military personnel who died while on duty in Halifax.

Prince Edward Commemorations 

 Lt. Benjamin James, Royal Nova Scotia Regiment, died while trying to rescue those who died aboard  (1797);
 Major Charles Domville, Royal Rifles, Dec. 1797, 7th Regiment (at Halifax from 1796 till 1799), Major 16 September 1795, died January 1798.
 Charles Thomas, H.M. 7th Royal Fusiliers regiment, died from friendly fire; (son of Nathaniel Thomas, Loyalist)
 James Brace Sutherland (c.1782 – September 25, 1798), son of Captain Andrew Sutherland; a midshipman who died in storm, age 16, in Halifax harbour on board HMS Prevoyante
 Benjamin Etter – Prince Edward's honorary aide-de-camp
 Dr. James Boggs (surgeon) – Prince Edward's surgeon

Other

Napoleonic Wars (1803–1815)

Battle of Trafalgar

Peninsular War 

 Major James Butler, 62nd Regiment He fought under the command of Sir Samuel Hulse in the Peninsular War

War of 1812 

 Lieut, Col. John-Fowell (J.F.) Goodridge, 62nd Regiment of Foot (January 1768 – 12 November 1819) – monument erected by the 62nd in his memory; buried his 2-year-old in Halifax who died in fire
 William Ross, died 1822, Nova Scotia Fencibles; founder of Ross Farm, Lunenburg County, Nova Scotia, unmarked grave

Privateers 
 Captain Benjamin Ellenwood, died 1815, murdered
 Captain Ebenezer Herrington, died 1812, friendly fire

Battle of Waterloo 

 Lieut. William Johnson Thornhill,  03 Jan. 1812 99th (Prince of Wales's Tipperary) Regiment of Foot – His Commander James Orde was court marshalled in Halifax for abusing his soldiers.

Military Officers (1816–1844) 

 Hon. William Cropton, died 1838, (2C) 85th Infantry; Brother to Baron Crofton, The Crofton Baronetcy, of Mohill in the County of County Leitrim  (Plaque in St. Paul's)
 Commander John George Dewar, . died 1830 (also plaque in St. Paul's church)  Plaque also in North Middleton churchyard
 John Thompson, Surgeon, HMS Saracen, died 1818
 Serg William George, 74th (Highland) Regiment of Foot, died 1828
 William Pepperell, Quarter Master of the 34th Regiment of Foot, died 1837
 Elizabeth Pepperell, grand daughter of William Pepperell through marriage, died 1775; wife of grandson William Pepperrell
 Col Sgt. John Reilly, 64th (2nd Staffordshire) Regiment of Foot, died 1842
 John Ross, R.N., died 1844
 Lieut. Charles A. Ross, R.N., died 1828
 Lieut. James Philips, RN, died 1821
 Westmount, Capt. John 4 May 1816, Royal Staff Corps

Other 

 Mary Welsford, mother of Parker Welsford (Welsford-Parker Monument)
 Charles Morris (1759–1831)
 William Annand, father of William Annand
 Dr. Samuel Head, first doctor born in Nova Scotia
 Robert Collins (died 26 March 1812) and his wife Sarah (Wisdom) Collins (died 31 January 1812), namesake of Collins Grove, Dartmouth
 James Gautier
 Honorable Charles Hill (jurist) died 1825; brother-in-law of Thomas Cochran (Nova Scotia politician); director of the Shubenacadie Canal Company
 John Thomas Twining, died 1832, son of John Thomas Twining
 Phoebe Perkins, died 1820, wife of Rev. Cyrus Perkins, Rector of Annapolis, 1807–1817,

Sculptor James Hay 

There are various gravestones by stone carvers from London and the local region. Museum curator Deborah Trask asserts that one of the first stone sculptors, James Hay (1750–1842), likely made the gravestone of Richard Bulkeley's wife Mary.  On one side Hay carved the angel Gabriel trumpeting, symbolic of the resurrection.  The religious text: "In a moment, in a twinkling of an eye at the last trump; for the trumpet shall sound, and the dead shall be raised incorruptible, and we shall be changed" (1 Cor. 15:52). (The trumpeting motive is also on the gravestone of the Lawson children). On the opposite side of the gravestone is an image in the garden of Eden.  The religious text: "For as in Adam all die, even so in Christ shall all be made alive." (1 Corinthians 15:22).  The image is taken from "The Child's Guide" (London, 1725).

Depictions in media 
In Lucy Maud Montgomery's Anne of the Island, Anne moves to Kingsport (Halifax, Nova Scotia) on the mainland and enrols at Redmond (Dalhousie University). She takes lodgings in an apartment that looks out over "Old St. John's Cemetery" – the Old Burying Ground:They went in by the entrance gates, past the simple, massive, stone arch surmounted by the great lion of England.... They found themselves in a dim, cool, green place where winds were fond of purring. Up and down the long grassy aisles they wandered, reading the quaint, voluminous epitaphs, carved in an age that had more leisure than our own.The text goes into some depth about the gravestone carvings and styles:Every citizen of Kingsport feels a thrill of possessive pride in Old St. John’s, for, if he be of any pretensions at all, he has an ancestor buried there, with a queer, crooked slab at his head, or else sprawling protectively over the grave, on which all the main facts of his history are recorded. For the most part no great art or skill was lavished on those old tombstones. The larger number are of roughly chiselled brown or gray native stone, and only in a few cases is there any attempt at ornamentation. Some are adorned with skull and cross-bones, and this grizzly decoration is frequently coupled with a cherub’s head. Many are prostrate and in ruins. Into almost all Time’s tooth has been gnawing, until some inscriptions have been completely effaced, and others can only be deciphered with difficulty. The graveyard is very full and very bowery, for it is surrounded and intersected by rows of elms and willows, beneath whose shade the sleepers must lie very dreamlessly, forever crooned to by the winds and leaves over them, and quite undisturbed by the clamor of traffic just beyond.

See also 
 Old Parish Burying Ground (Windsor, Nova Scotia)
 Fort Moncton – oldest British military gravestones in region
 Garrison Cemetery (Annapolis Royal, Nova Scotia)
 Royal Navy Burying Ground (Halifax, Nova Scotia)
 Hillcrest Cemetery (Lunenburg, Nova Scotia)
 St. John's Anglican Church (Lunenburg)
 Little Dutch (Deutsch) Church – St. George's Cemetery

References

External links 
 
 The treatment of Halifax's poor house dead during the nineteenth and twentieth centuries By Cynthia Simpson. 2011
 Memorials at St. Paul's Church. Acadiensis. Vol. 5, p. 57
 The (Old St. Paul's) Burying Ground
 Halifax's Old Burying Ground
 Old Burying Ground Foundation
 List of People buried in cemetery
 Finda a Grave – list of gravesite with photos
 Honours Thesis. St. Mary's University
 Loyalists in the Old Burying Ground
 Nova Scotia Museum
 

Cemeteries in Halifax, Nova Scotia
Anglican cemeteries in Canada
National Historic Sites in Nova Scotia